Bachhaupter Laber is a small river of Bavaria, Germany. At its confluence with the Wissinger Laber in Breitenbrunn, the Breitenbrunner Laber is formed.

See also
List of rivers of Bavaria

References

Rivers of Bavaria
Rivers of Germany